Charles Amos Babb (February 20, 1873 – March 19, 1954), was a professional baseball player who played shortstop from 1903 to 1905. He managed in the minor leagues from 1906 to 1913.

Professional career

Pre-MLB
In  he played for the Fort Wayne Railroaders of the Western Association, where he batted .308 with 150 hits in 132 games.

In  he split the season between the Indianapolis Indians of the American Association and the Memphis Egyptians of the Southern Association. He hit .298 with Indianapolis in 50 games and he hit .284 with Memphis in 66 games.

New York Giants
He hit .248 with 105 hits, 15 doubles, eight triples and 46 RBIs. This was his only season with the Giants.

Brooklyn Superbas
On December 12,  he was traded by the New York Giants with Jack Cronin and $6,000 to the Brooklyn Superbas for Bill Dahlen.

In  Babb hit .265 with 138 hits, 18 doubles, three triples and 53 RBIs. This would prove to be his best season statistically at the  Major League level.

This would be his last season in the Majors.

Post-MLB
He became a player-manager after his career in the Major League Baseball. In  he played and managed the Memphis Egyptians, a job he kept until .

In  he began the season with the Norfolk Tars of the Virginia League, playing and managing. He appeared in 126 games before he joined the St. Joseph Drummers of the Western League.

Babb joined the Altoona Rams/Reading Pretzels of the Tri-State League. In his return to playing-managing he appeared in 75 games and hit .283.

In his final season, Babb joined the Wichita Witches of the Western League. He appeared in only 41 games, batting a dismal .172.

External links

1873 births
1954 deaths
Major League Baseball shortstops
Brooklyn Superbas players
New York Giants (NL) players
Portland Gladiators players
Fort Wayne Farmers players
New Castle Salamanders players
Toledo Mud Hens players
Wheeling Nailers (baseball) players
Fort Wayne Indians players
Columbus Senators players
Wheeling Stogies players
Indianapolis Hoosiers (minor league) players
Fort Wayne Railroaders players
Memphis Egyptians players
Indianapolis Indians players
Memphis Turtles players
Norfolk Tars players
St. Joseph Drummers players
Altoona Rams players
Reading Pretzels players
Wichita Witches players
Minor league baseball managers
Baseball players from Oregon
Sportspeople from Milwaukie, Oregon
Burials at Portland Memorial Mausoleum